The GAZelle NEXT is a product improved version of the original GAZelle series of medium duty vans and trucks produced by the Russian automotive giant GAZ. It is produced alongside the original GAZelle now known as the GAZelle Business.

The first available model is equipped with a four-cylinder turbo diesel motor from Cummins, which has 129 horsepower at 3600 revolutions a minute, with a fuel consumption of urban: 10.5 L/100 km, extra-urban: 8.5 L/100 km and combined. 9.0 L/100 km. The engine meets the Euro 4 and Euro 5 emission standards.

On 10 April 2013, series production of GAZelle Next was started.

7 March 2014, the serial production of Gazelle NEXT with a double cab began.

24 March, the production of Gazelle NEXT Cityline bus.

In May 2014 GAZ received Single European vehicle type approval, which allowed them to sell the Gazelle NEXT in the European Union.

In September 2015, the Comtrans exhibition in Moscow included a panel van and minibus on this base. Sales of the panel van started in April 2016 and the minibus in November 2016.

Models
 GAZ-А21R22-20 flatbed truck
 GAZ-А21R32-10 flatbed truck with extended wheelbase
 GAZ-А22R22-10 flatbed truck with double cab
 GAZ-А22R32-20 flatbed truck with double cab and extended wheelbase
 GAZ-А23R22-0011-26 refrigerator truck
 GAZ-А23R32-0011-26 refrigerator truck with extended wheelbase
 GAZ-А23R32-0011-18-641 manufactured goods van
 GAZ-А23R32-0011-18-041 manufactured goods van with extended wheelbase
 Ambulance car modular class "B"
 Ambulance car modular class "C"
 GAZ-А64R42 particularly small urban bus
 GAZ-А63R42 particularly small suburban bus

Trim levels
There are 3 items: Basic version, Comfort 1 and Comfort 2.

Basic version include power steering, cruise control, alarm door open position, stabilizers front and rear, adjustable lighting of the dashboard, on-board computer, heated side mirrors, electric power windows, audiopreparation, washer tank capacity of 5 liters, central locking, driver's seat with adjustable and armrest, steering column with height adjustment, heater radiator, lighter, tool kit.

In Comfort 1 added fog lights, audiosystem, electric power door mirrors, seat "Lux" heated and lumbar support.

In Comfort 2 added preheater of engine, high capacity battery 85 Ah.

For all trim levels are available as options differential lock, brake system with ABS, air conditioning.

New family (restyling): GAZelle NN (New Next) 

Gazelle NN (New Next) is a restyled version of Gazelle Next. The exterior of the cab of the new Gazelle is attractive and moderately original, because the designers chose a very interesting LED optics for the design of the front. The architecture of the front part itself has remained the same and even bears a certain family style, so it will not be possible to confuse this car with any other.

Detailed in the new version of the Russian Next, the hood has changed — it has become more embossed, the plastic front bumper has changed the side "air intakes" and another, central, radiator grille has appeared — it has received a stylish three–dimensional shape. The sidewalls remained the same, with the exception of the exterior mirror housings, which, as proposed by the Gazelle Next 2021 concept, will now be painted in body color. Inside the cabin there is a new front panel with rectangular air ducts, a full-fledged multi-steering wheel equipped with heating, and a central touch display.

To the left of it there are physical control buttons, below – a compact climate control console. The engine start button is located to the right of the steering wheel, but the compartments for small things, even if they changed their shape, but remained in their places, so the GAZelle driver will definitely not have to get used to a different storage system.

The driver's seat has also been improved, which will become softer due to the air suspension. As for the double sofa, you can make a comfortable table out of it by folding the back. The manufacturer promised that all current engines will remain in the ranks of the new Gazelle Next 2021 model year: 2.8-liter Cummins ISF turbodiesel engines with a capacity of 120 and 150 hp, as well as a 3.0-liter Evotech gasoline engine and its equivalent, in addition to gasoline, consuming liquefied propane.

The classic 5-speed manual "box" will remain available, while the manufacturer plans to offer other options, for example, a "robot" or a new "six-speed", which is designed specifically for modifications with a new Volkswagen diesel engine.

Gazelle NN versions

Single cab truck (3-seater)

Standard base: 
 GAZ-A21R22-70 "Gazelle NN" (Cummins diesel)
 GAZ-A21R23-50 "Gazelle NN" (UMZ Evotech petrol)
 GAZ-A21R25-20 "Gazelle NN" (UMZ HBO UMZ Evotech)

Extended base: 
 GAZ-A21R32-70 "Gazelle NN" (Cummins diesel)
 GAZ-A21R33-50 "Gazelle NN" (UMZ Evotech petrol)
 GAZ-A21R35-10 "Gazelle NN" (UMZ HBO Evotech)

Extended base (4.6 tons): 
 GAZ-C41R92-80 "Gazelle NN" (Cummins diesel)

Double cab truck (7-seater)

Standard base: 
 GAZ-A22R22-70 "Gazelle NN" (Cummins diesel)
 GAZ-A22R23-50 "Gazelle NN" (UMZ Evotech petrol)

Extended base: 
 GAZ-A22R32-70 "Gazelle NN" (Cummins diesel)
 GAZ-A22R33-55 "Gazelle NN" (UMZ Evotech petrol)
 GAZ-A22R35-20 "Gazelle NN" (UMZ HBO Evotech)

Extended base (4.6 tons): 
 GAZ-C42R92-80 "Gazelle NN" (Cummins diesel)

Van

Standard (3-seater)

Standard base: 
 GAZ-A31R32-80 "Gazelle NN" (Cummins diesel)
 GAZ-A31R23-60 "Gazelle NN" (UMZ Evotech petrol)

Extended base: 
 GAZ-A31R33-60 "Gazelle NN" (UMZ Evotech petrol)

Extended base (4.6 tons): 
 GAZ-C45R92-80 "Gazelle NN" (Cummins diesel)

Combi (7-seater)

Standard base: 
 GAZ-A32R22-80 "Gazelle NN" (Cummins diesel)
 GAZ-A32R23-60 "Gazelle NN" (UMZ Evotech petrol)

Extended base: 
 GAZ-A32R32-80 "Gazelle NN" (Cummins diesel)
 GAZ-A32R33-60 "Gazelle NN" (UMZ Evotech petrol)

Extended base (4.6 tons): 
 GAZ-C46R92-80 "Gazelle NN" (Cummins diesel)

Undocumented features 
In the dashboard of the car there is an "Easter egg" — the game "Tetris"

Projects/models based on GAZelle NEXT and NN

See also
 GAZelle - the original mid-sized trucks, vans and buses made by Russian car manufacturer GAZ.
 Ural Next - russian truck with increased cross-country capability.

External links

 GAZelle NEXT official page (English)
 Configurator on the official website GAZ

Vans
Pickup trucks
Minibuses
GAZ Group vehicles